Hugh Giles Keyworth Broughton (born February 1965 in Worcester) is an English architect and one of the world's leading designers of polar research facilities. His practice, Hugh Broughton Architects, was founded in 1995 and is based in London, works internationally. The practice has won several high profile international design competitions, including Halley VI Research Station, Juan Carlos 1 Spanish Antarctic Base, the Atmospheric Watch Observatory in Greenland for the US National Science Foundation and a new health facility on Tristan da Cunha, the world's most remote inhabited island. , current polar work includes the redevelopment of Scott Base for Antarctica New Zealand, designed in collaboration with Jasmax; and the modernisation of the Rothera Research Station for the British Antarctic Survey (2023). In 2019 the practice completed the conservation of the Grade I listed Painted Hall in the Old Royal Naval College, Greenwich, designed by Sir Christopher Wren in 1696.

The practice has received four RIBA National Awards, one RIBA International Award (2013), and seven RIBA Regional Awards (including 2016, and 2019). Other awards include Museums and Heritage Award 2019, New London Awards 2018, The American Prize for Architecture 2016, Civic Trust Award Special Award for Sustainability 2014, three AJ Retrofit Awards in 2013, and BD International Breakthrough Architect of the Year Award 2012 

Hugh lectures internationally and has served on numerous architectural juries including the 2013 RIBA Manser Medal, the 2014 AJ Retrofit Awards, the 2015 RIBA Awards and the Architizer Awards; he is an assessor for the Civic Trust Awards. He was named on the Evening Standard The Progress 1000: London's most influential people 2018 - Visualisers: Architecture.

Education
 1990 BA MA (Hons) Dip Arch, Architecture, University of Edinburgh

Significant buildings

 2019 The Painted Hall, Old Royal Naval College, Greenwich, London, England
 2018 The Rookery, TUC Congress House, London, England
 2017 - 2021 (ongoing) Redevelopment of the Dockyard Church, Royal Navy Dockyard, Isle of Sheppey, Sheerness, Kent, originally designed by George Ledwell Taylor in 1828
 2017 Henry Moore Studios & Gardens, Perry Green, Hertfordshire, England
 2016 The Portland Collection, The Harley Gallery, Welbeck Estate, Nottinghamshire, England

 2015 Institution of Structural Engineers
 2014-2018 The Painted Hall, Old Royal Naval College, Greenwich, London, England
 2013 Halley VI Research Station for the British Antarctic Survey

 2012 Maidstone Museum East Wing 

 2012-ongoing Atmospheric Watch Observatory at Summit Station on the apex of the Greenland ice sheet for the US National Science Foundation

 2007-ongoing Juan Carlos I Antarctic Base base on Livingston Island

 2005 British Council Malaysia
 1998 South Wimbledon District Guides

 1996-ongoing TUC Congress House, London

Further reading

See also

 British Antarctic Survey
 Congress House
 Greenland ice sheet
 Halley VI Research Station (competition winning design)
 Harley Gallery and Foundation
 Institution of Structural Engineers
 Henry Moore Foundation
 Juan Carlos I Antarctic Base
 Livingston Island
 Maidstone Museum & Art Gallery
 Old Royal Naval College
 Scott Base
 Sheerness Dockyard
 Summit Station
 US National Science Foundation
 Venice Biennale of Architecture

Notes

References

External links

Living people
1965 births
Architects from Worcestershire
Alumni of the University of Edinburgh